Maria Azucena "Marichu" Vera-Perez Maceda was a Filipino film producer.

Early life
Maria Azucena Vera-Perez, was born on December 23, 1942 to Jose R. Perez and Azucena "Nene" Vera who owned and managed Sampaguita Pictures. Maria Azucena or Marichu, was the eldest of seven children.

Career
Maceda was born to the Vera-Perez family who are known for owning Sampaguita Pictures, a major production company in the Philippines from the 1930s to the 1970s. Maceda, who would be affectionally known as "Manay Ichu" within the film industry, grew to be a film producer herself. She is known for producing the 1982 film Batch '81 directed by Mike de Leon and the 1978 film Dyesebel of Anthony Taylor. Working within and outside of Sampaguita, Maceda would also work as a writer and production designer. She would also setup MVP Pictures.

She also had a role in the establishment of various film organizations in the Philippines such as the Film Development Council of the Philippines, Movie Workers Welfare Foundation, Metro Manila Film Festival, and the Film Academy of the Philippines.

Death
Maceda who had a lingering illness died on September 7, 2020 due to cardio respiratory failure at the age of 77. She died at a hospital  in Quezon City.

Personal life
Marichu Maceda was married to Ernesto Maceda, a former senator. They had five children. One of her children, Edward became a city councilor of Manila. Maceda's maternal grandfather, Jose O. Vera was also a senator.

References

Filipino film producers
2020 deaths
1942 births